Cetrimide agar is a type of agar used for the selective isolation of the gram-negative bacterium, Pseudomonas aeruginosa. As the name suggests, it contains cetrimide, which is the selective agent against alternate microbial flora. Cetrimide also enhances the production of Pseudomonas pigments such as pyocyanin and pyoverdine, which show a characteristic blue-green and yellow-green colour, respectively.

Cetrimide agar is widely used in
the examination of cosmetics, pharmaceuticals and clinical
specimens to test for the presence of Pseudomonas aeruginosa.

References

External links 
 Cetrimide Agar Description & Formulation

Biochemistry detection reactions
Cell culture media
Microbiological media